Yuzhny Airport  is an airport in Russia located 6 km southwest of Oryol. It services small transports and has a considerable general aviation presence.

From the 1950s to the 1970s, it was a military airbase, with the based 472nd Fighter Aviation Regiment (PVO) flying respectively the Yak-17, MiG-15, MiG-17 and MiG-19.

References

Defunct airports
Soviet Air Force bases
Airports built in the Soviet Union
Airports in Oryol Oblast